Sarah Ruth Rees Jones  (born 1957) is a British historian. She is Professor of Medieval History and director of the Centre for Medieval Studies at the University of York.

Career
Rees Jones received her PhD in 1987 from the University of York with a thesis titled 'Property, Tenure and Rents: Some Aspects of Topogaphy and Economy of Medieval York'.

Rees Jones is a Trustee of the Historic Towns Trust. She was elected as a Fellow of the Society of Antiquaries of London on 5 February 2009. She is also a Fellow of the Royal Historical Society.

She was the principal investigator on the team that discovered the story of Joan of Leeds; a 14th-century nun who faked her own death to leave St. Clement's Nunnery in York to live with a man in Beverley.

Rees Jones appeared on an episode of Time Team in 2005.

Select publications
Rees Jones, S. 1997. The government of medieval York : essays in commemoration of the 1396 royal charter. Borthwick Institute of Historical Research.
Rees Jones, S., Marks, R., and Minnis, A. J., 2000. Courts and regions in medieval Europe. York Medieval Press. 
Rees Jones, S. 2003. Learning and literacy in medieval England and abroad. Brepols.
Rees Jones, S. 2014. York : the making of a city 1068-1350. Oxford University Press. 
Rees Jones, S. and Watson, S. C. 2016. Christians and Jews in Angevin England : the York Massacre of 1190, narratives and contexts/ York Medieval Press
Brown, S., Rees Jones, S., and Ayers, T, (eds). 2022. ''York: Art, Architecture, and Archaeology (The British Archaeological Association Conference Transactions XLII). Routledge.

References 

Fellows of the Society of Antiquaries of London
Living people
Alumni of the University of York
Academics of the University of York
British women historians
Fellows of the Royal Historical Society
Medievalists
1957 births